Kur Shurab-e Alishah (also Romanized as Kūr Shūrāb-e ‘Alīshāh; also known as Kūr Shūrāb-e Soflá) is a village in Mamulan Rural District, Mamulan District, Pol-e Dokhtar County, Lorestan Province, Iran. At the 2006 census, its population was 130, in 28 families.

References 

Towns and villages in Pol-e Dokhtar County